Caro maestro (Dear teacher) is an Italian television comedy series which aired from 1996 to 1997 on Canale 5. The series follows Stefano Giusti (Marco Columbro), a bus driver who is allowed to teach at Forte dei Marmi elementary school in which he was raised. There, he meets and falls in love with Elisa (Elena Sofia Ricci), teacher and director of the school, with whom he used to date.

Cast

Marco Columbro: Stefano Giusti
Elena Sofia Ricci: Elisa Terenzi
Sandra Mondaini: zia Ottilia
Francesca Reggiani: Monica Giusti
Antonella Elia: Antonella 
Stefania Sandrelli: Francesca Deodato 
Carlotta Tesconi: Alice 
Nicola Pistoia: Carlo Carloni
Isa Gallinelli: Claudia De Santis
Francesco Bonelli: Bruno Verticella
Barbara Cupisti: Giovanna Gimignano 
Edoardo Nevola: padre Andrea Bonelli 
Claudia Vegliante: madre di Carlotta 
Franca Valeri: Elvira Piersanti 
Pino Ammendola: padre di Claudio 
Pino Colizzi: architetto Chiari 
Roberto Alpi: Cesare Catania
Vittorio Amandola: Saverio Serranti
Francesco Venditti: Fabio 
Myriam Catania: fidanzata di Fabio 
Margot Sikabonyi: Cristina (2ª season)

See also
List of Italian television series

External links
 Sito ufficiale di Caro Maestro
 

Italian television series
1996 Italian television series debuts
1997 Italian television series endings
1990s Italian television series
Canale 5 original programming